Latasha Khan (born January 20, 1973 in Seattle) is a professional female squash player who has represented the United States in international competition. She reached a career-high world ranking of World No. 18 in January 2000.  She started to play at the age of 9. She earned a team and individual gold medal at the 2003 Pan Am Games in Santo Domingo, Dominican Republic. With 3,410 points on the international points table in September 2009, she was ranked No. 28 in the international circuit. She is a right handed player. After spending some time as a junior player, Khan started to play professional squash back in 1992. Khan practices and plays at Seattle Athletic Club Downtown under the coaching of Yusuf Khan and uses Prince brand of racquets. In 2009, she earned points by appearing in Sun & Surf 2009, Squash Pyramides 2009, Seoul Squash Open 2009, Fassp St Luke's Open 2009, Subway Goshen Open 2009, Cayman Islands Open 2009, Racquet Club International 2009, Atwater Cup 2009, Burning River Classic 2009 and Liberty Bell Open 2009. Her hobbies and interests includes shopping and music. Her sister Shabana Khan is also a former professional squash player, and their father is a cousin of squash legend Jahangir Khan.

References

External links 
 
 
 

1973 births
Living people
American female squash players
Pan American Games gold medalists for the United States
Pan American Games silver medalists for the United States
Pan American Games bronze medalists for the United States
Pan American Games medalists in squash
Squash players at the 1999 Pan American Games
Squash players at the 2003 Pan American Games
Squash players at the 2007 Pan American Games
Sportspeople from Seattle
Medalists at the 1999 Pan American Games
Medalists at the 2003 Pan American Games
Medalists at the 2007 Pan American Games
21st-century American women